Toilet paper (also toilet roll in the UK) is a soft tissue paper product used to maintain personal hygiene.

"Toilet paper" may also refer to:

"Toilet Paper" (South Park episode), an episode of the animated television series
 Toiletpaper (magazine), a biannual Italian photography magazine

See also
Toilet papering, an act of vandalism which uses toilet paper